Cuacuba is a genus of Brazilian ray spiders first described by P. H. Prete, I. Cizauskas & Antônio Domingos Brescovit in 2018.  it contains only two species.

References

External links

Araneomorphae genera
Theridiosomatidae